Jafnharr ("Equally High" or "Just-as-high") is a member of the "Mysterious Three," those who guard Valhalla in Norse Mythology. These three appear in Gylfaginning in the Prose Edda. They sat on three thrones in Asgard where they answered the questions of Gylfi who sought wisdom. The other two were Hárr ("High") and Þriði ("Third").  Each of them was, as it turned out, an incarnation of Odin.

See also
High, Just-as-High, and Third

References

External links
Odin's heiti (Uppsalaonline)

Characters in Norse mythology
Names of Odin